Javier Ocampo López (born 19 June 1939) is a Colombian historian, writer, folklorist and professor. He has been important in the fields of Colombian folklore and history of Latin America and Colombia, especially contributing on the department of Boyacá, the homeland of the Muisca and their religion and mythology. He wrote exclusively in Spanish.

Biography 
Javier Ocampo López was born in Aguadas, a village famous for the pasillo (a Colombian type of waltz), in the department of Caldas in west-central Colombia to parents Francisco Ocampo Gutiérrez and Doña Teresa López Hurtado. He has one brother, Fabio. In 1956 he finished his secondary education as best student of his class. Ocampo plays the clarinet since the age of twelve and was a member of the music group of his village of birth.

Ocampo went to study in 1956 at the Facultad de Ciencias Sociales y Económicas ("Faculty of Social and Economical Sciences") of the Pedagogical and Technological University of Colombia, where he obtained his degree in social sciences.

Ocampo López obtained his PhD at El Colegio de México in 1969 with his thesis titled Las ideas de un día. El pueblo mexicano ante la consumación de su independencia ("Ideas of one day. The Mexican people before the consummation of their independence").

Over the course of 57 years, Ocampo López has been the author of 100 books, co-authored 47 and published 200 studies in specialized literature and national and international newspapers.

In 1960 he taught at the Colegio Nacional Académico in Cartago (Valle del Cauca) and from 1963 at the Pedagogical and Technological University of Colombia in Tunja.

Ocampo wrote several biographies about Colombian historical figures; presidents, generals and others; Antonio Villavicencio, Julián Trujillo Largacha, Santos Gutiérrez, María Antonia Santos Plata, Manuel Antonio Sanclemente, Eustorgio Salgar, Gustavo Rojas Pinilla, Manuel Rodríguez Torices, Antonio José de Sucre, José Miguel Pey, José Manuel Marroquín, Carlos Holguín, José de Obaldía, José Eusebio Otálora.

A public library in his birthplace Aguadas has been named in his honour.

Works 
This list is a selection.

Books 
 2013 – Mitos y leyendas indígenas de Colombia
 2011 – El proceso ideológico de la independencia
 2007 – Grandes culturas indígenas de América
 2006 – El folclor y las fiestas en Colomba
 2006 – Mitos, leyendas y relatos colombianos
 2001 – Mitos y leyendas de Antioquia la Grande
 1996 – Leyendas populares colombianas
 1977 – El pueblo boyacense y su folclor

Articles 
 1993 – Fiestas religiosas y romerías. El abigarrado mundo de las devociones populares en Colombia
 1974 – El proceso ideológico de la emancipación
 1970 – La artesanía popular boyacense y su importancia en la geografía turística y económica

See also 

List of Muisca scholars, ICANH
Muisca
Muisca mythology, religion

References

Notable works by Ocampo López 
 
 
 
 

1939 births
21st-century Colombian historians
20th-century Colombian historians
Colombian folklorists
Muisca scholars
Living people
National Autonomous University of Mexico alumni
Pedagogical and Technological University of Colombia people
Muisca mythology and religion